The 2012 PGA EuroPro Tour, titled as the 2012 888poker.com PGA EuroPro Tour for sponsorship reasons, was the 11th season of the PGA EuroPro Tour, one of four third-tier tours recognised by the European Tour.

Schedule
The following table lists official events during the 2012 season.

Order of Merit
The Order of Merit was titled as the 888poker.com Order of Merit and was based on prize money won during the season, calculated in Pound sterling. The top five players on the tour (not otherwise exempt) earned status to play on the 2013 Challenge Tour.

Notes

References

PGA EuroPro Tour